Kazayak (Qaźayaq) is a rural locality (a selo) in Krasnovoskhodsky Selsoviet, Iglinsky District, Bashkortostan, Russia. The population was 878 as of 2010. There are 14 streets.

Geography 
Kazayak is located 72 km northeast of Iglino (the district's administrative centre) by road. Novobakayevo is the nearest rural locality.

References 

Rural localities in Iglinsky District